The 2012 United States presidential election in Illinois took place on November 6, 2012, as part of the 2012 United States presidential election in which all 50 states plus the District of Columbia participated. Illinois voters chose 20 electors to represent them in the Electoral College via a popular vote pitting incumbent Democratic President Barack Obama and his running mate, Vice President Joe Biden, against Republican challenger and former Massachusetts Governor Mitt Romney and his running mate, Congressman Paul Ryan. The Obama/Biden ticket won Illinois with 57.60% of the popular vote to Romney/Ryan's 40.73%, thus winning the state's twenty electoral votes by a margin of 16.87%.

Obama's victory continued a Democratic winning streak in the state — with the Democratic candidate having carried Illinois through the six consecutive elections. However, despite Obama's win in 2008 and popularity in the state due to being its former U.S. Senator, his performance significantly worsened, with his margin of victory decreasing from 25.14% to 16.87% and losing 23 counties to Romney that he had won four years prior. Obama further became the first ever Democrat to win the White House without carrying Gallatin or Macoupin Counties, as well as the first since Woodrow Wilson in 1916 to win the White House without carrying Madison County, the first since John F. Kennedy in 1960 to do so without carrying Calhoun, Cass, Macon, Mason, Montgomery, or Pulaski Counties, and the first since Jimmy Carter in 1976 to do so without carrying Bureau, Coles, Kankakee, LaSalle, McDonough, Schuyler, or Vermillion Counties.

Owing perhaps to Obama's home-state strength as well as to the nationwide shift of rural voters toward the GOP during Donald Trump's two runs in 2016 and 2020, Obama remains the last Democrat to win Alexander County, Carroll County, Fulton County, Henderson County, Henry County, Jo Daviess County, Knox County, Mercer County, Putnam County, Warren County, and Whiteside County.

Primaries

Democratic

The 2012 Illinois Democratic presidential primary was held on March 20, 2012 in the U.S. state of Illinois as one of the Republican Party's state primaries ahead of the 2012 presidential election. Incumbent president Barack Obama won the primary. Obama was running for reelection without a major opponent.

Obama won all 189 of the state's bound delegates (the state also had 26 superdelegates).

Republican

The 2012 Illinois Republican presidential primary was held on March 20, 2012 in the U.S. state of Illinois as one of the Republican Party's state primaries ahead of the 2012 presidential election. For the state-run primaries (Democratic and Republican), turnout was 21.72%, with 1,586,171 votes cast. For the general election, turnout was 69.70%, with 5,242,014 votes cast.

Green

The 2012 Illinois Green Party Convention was held on February 24, and saw a binding presidential preference vote cast, awarding delegates, as part of the Green Party's state primaries ahead of the 2012 presidential election.

Unlike the primaries for the major parties, this primary was run by the Green Party of Illinois itself, rather than by the state.

General election
While Obama only won 23% of the counties in Illinois, most of the counties he won were heavily populated. His 17-point victory can be largely attributed to his performance in Cook County, which encompasses the Chicago Metropolitan Area. He also won the once Republican favored collar counties (DuPage, Will and Lake). He also performed well in the East St. Louis area.

Results

Results by county

Counties that flipped from Democratic to Republican

 Boone (largest city: Belvidere)
 Bureau (largest city: Princeton)
 Calhoun (largest village: Hardin)
 Cass (largest city: Beardstown)
 Coles (largest city: Charleston)
 Gallatin (largest city: Shawneetown)
 Grundy (largest city: Morris)
 Kankakee (largest city: Kankakee)
 Kendall (largest village: Oswego)
 LaSalle (largest city: Ottawa)
 Macon (largest city: Decatur)
 Mason (largest city: Havana)
 Macoupin (largest city: Carlinville)
 Madison (largest city: Granite City)
 McDonough (largest city: Macomb)
 McHenry (largest city: Crystal Lake)
 McLean (largest city: Bloomington)
 Montgomery (largest city: Litchfield)
 Pulaski (largest city: Mounds)
 Sangamon (largest city: Springfield)
 Schuyler (largest city: Rushville)
 Stephenson (largest city: Freeport)
 Vermilion (largest city: Danville)

By congressional district
Obama won 12 of 18 congressional districts.

See also
 United States presidential elections in Illinois
 Illinois Republican Party
 2012 Republican Party presidential debates and forums
 2012 Republican Party presidential primaries
 Results of the 2012 Republican Party presidential primaries

References

External links
The Green Papers: for Illinois
The Green Papers: Major state elections in chronological order

United States President
Illinois
2012